Universalist Church Historic District is a registered historic district in Montgomery, Ohio, listed in the National Register of Historic Places on December 2, 1970.  It contains 3 contributing buildings.

It is one of five locations in Montgomery that is listed on the Register, along with the Blair House, the Montgomery Saltbox Houses, the Wilder-Swaim House, and the Yost Tavern.

Historic uses 
Religious Structure
Church Related Residence

Notes 

National Register of Historic Places in Hamilton County, Ohio
Montgomery, Ohio
Historic districts in Hamilton County, Ohio
Historic districts on the National Register of Historic Places in Ohio